is a Japanese competitive swimmer. He competed in the men's 4 × 200 metre freestyle relay at the 2012 and 2016 Summer Olympics, winning a bronze medal in the latter Games.

References

1993 births
Living people
Japanese male butterfly swimmers
Olympic swimmers of Japan
Swimmers at the 2012 Summer Olympics
Japanese male freestyle swimmers
Asian Games medalists in swimming
Swimmers at the 2010 Asian Games
Swimmers at the 2014 Asian Games
Swimmers at the 2018 Asian Games
Olympic bronze medalists for Japan
Olympic bronze medalists in swimming
Medalists at the 2016 Summer Olympics
Swimmers at the 2016 Summer Olympics
Medalists at the FINA World Swimming Championships (25 m)
Universiade medalists in swimming
Asian Games gold medalists for Japan
Asian Games silver medalists for Japan
Asian Games bronze medalists for Japan
Medalists at the 2010 Asian Games
Medalists at the 2014 Asian Games
Medalists at the 2018 Asian Games
Universiade gold medalists for Japan
Universiade bronze medalists for Japan
Medalists at the 2017 Summer Universiade
21st-century Japanese people